The 2011 Italian Open (also known as the 2011 Rome Masters and sponsored title 2011 Internazionali BNL d'Italia) was a tennis tournament, being played on outdoor clay courts at the Foro Italico in Rome, Italy. It was the 68th edition of the event and was classified as an ATP World Tour Masters 1000 event on the 2011 ATP World Tour and a Premier 5 event on the 2011 WTA Tour. It took place from 9 to 15 May 2011.

Points and prize money

Point distribution

Prize money
All money is in Euros

ATP entrants

Seeds

 Rankings are as of 2 May 2011.

Other entrants
The following players received wildcards into the main draw:
  Simone Bolelli
  Fabio Fognini
  Potito Starace
  Filippo Volandri

The following players received entry via qualifying:

  Igor Andreev
  Pablo Cuevas
  Victor Hănescu
  Łukasz Kubot
  Paolo Lorenzi
  Kei Nishikori
  Pere Riba

The following players received entry from a lucky losers spot:
  Adrian Mannarino
  Jarkko Nieminen
  Carlos Berlocq

Withdrawals
The following notable players withdrew from the event:
 Ivan Dodig (plays at Zagreb Challenger instead)
 Ernests Gulbis (withdrew due to respiratory problems)
 Janko Tipsarević (withdrew due to a right leg injury)
 David Nalbandian (withdrew due to illness)
 Tommy Robredo
 Gaël Monfils (withdrew due to sickness)
 David Ferrer (withdrew due to illness)
 Kei Nishikori

WTA entrants

Seeds

 Rankings are as of 2 May 2011.

Other entrants
The following players received wildcards into the main draw:
  Alberta Brianti
  Corinna Dentoni
  Romina Oprandi

The following players received entry via qualifying:

  Polona Hercog
  Varvara Lepchenko
  Christina McHale
  Anabel Medina Garrigues
  Arantxa Parra Santonja
  Tamira Paszek
  Anastasia Rodionova
  Chanelle Scheepers

The following players received entry from a lucky losers spot:
  Angelique Kerber
  Zheng Jie

Withdrawals
The following notable players withdrew from the event:
  Kim Clijsters (torn ligaments, right ankle)
  Dominika Cibulková (left abdominal injury)
  Julia Görges (lower back injury)
  Anna Chakvetadze (withdrew due to sickness)
  Ágnes Szávay (lower back injury)
  Serena Williams (pulmonary embolism)
  Venus Williams (torn abdominal)

Finals

Men's singles

 Novak Djokovic defeated  Rafael Nadal, 6–4, 6–4
It was Djokovic's 7th title of the year and 25th of his career. It was his 39th consecutive match win. It was his 2nd title in Rome, also winning in 2008. It was his 4th Masters of the year and 9th of his career.

Women's singles

 Maria Sharapova defeated  Samantha Stosur, 6–2, 6–4
It was Sharapova's 1st title of the year and 23rd of her career.

Men's doubles

 John Isner /  Sam Querrey defeated  Mardy Fish /  Andy Roddick, w/o

Women's doubles

 Peng Shuai /  Zheng Jie defeated  Vania King /  Yaroslava Shvedova, 6–2, 6–3

References

External links
Official website

 
Italian Open
Italian Open
Tennis
2011 Italian Open (Tennis)
Italian Open (Tennis)